The Flemish American Football League (FAFL) is one of the two conferences of the Belgian Football League (BFL). It consists of teams from the Flemish Community, whereas the Ligue Francophone de Football Americain de Belgique (LFFAB) consists of teams from the French Community. The top three teams from the Flemish League qualify for the BFL playoffs at the conclusion of the regular season. The playoffs determine which teams play in the Belgian Bowl.

Teams
There are 9 FAFL teams.

Season's History
W = Wins, L = Losses, T = Ties, PCT = Winning Percentage, PF= Points For, PA = Points Against 
 - clinched seed to the playoffs

2005 season

2005 Playoffs

2006 season

2006 Playoffs

2007 season

2007 Playoffs

2008 season

2008 Playoffs

2009 season

2009 Playoffs

2010 season

2010 Playoffs

2011 season

2011 Playoffs

2012 season

2012 Playoffs

2013 season

2013 Playoffs

2014 season

2014 Playoffs

Statistics

FAFL Titles

Playoff Appearances

 years in bold are Belgian Bowl champions.
 Since 2008 there are three playoff tickets for the top three teams at the end of the regular season. There has been no number three ranked team that has qualified for the Belgian Bowl.

References

External links
Official FAFL website
Official BFL website
Official LFFAB website 
Dale's FAFL thoughts - FAFL Blog

American football in Belgium
American football leagues in Europe
2003 establishments in Belgium
Sports leagues established in 2003